Xiao Han (died 949), probably born with the name Shulü Han (述律翰), also named Dilie (敵烈), courtesy name Hanzhen (寒真), was a general of the Khitan-led Liao dynasty of China. After Emperor Taizong of Liao conquered the Later Jin, Xiao was left in control of the Later Jin's former capital Daliang, but he was unable to hold it. He later plotted against Emperor Taizong's nephew and successor Emperor Shizong and was executed.

Background 
It is not known when Xiao Han was born.  His father was Xiao Dilu (蕭敵魯) — probably still using the surname of Shulü (述律) at the time — who was a chancellor of the Liao dynasty (which would later become Liao) northern court, and who was a brother of Empress Shulü Ping, the wife of Khitan's first emperor Emperor Taizu and a son of Emperor Taizu's aunt.  Despite this close relationship, at some point, Xiao Han's mother was put to death by Empress Shulü, causing him to resent the empress from that point on.

The earliest reference to Xiao Han's military career was in 922, when Zhang Wenli, then in control of Chengde Circuit (成德, headquartered in modern Shijiazhuang, Hebei), was under the attack by the army of Khitan's southern neighbor Jin and sought Khitan aid.  While the Chinese accounts were that then Jin-commander Li Sizhao (adoptive cousin of Jin's prince Li Cunxu) died in battle with Zhang's army, Xiao's biography in the History of Liao contained a different narrative — that it was Xiao, whom Emperor Taizu sent to aid Zhang, who killed Li Sizhao.

In any case, after Emperor Taizu's death and succession by Emperor Taizu's son Emperor Taizong — who had married Xiao Han's sister Xiao Wen as his empress, and whose sister, according to the Chinese historical source Zizhi Tongjian, Xiao Han might have married, although it might have been a confusion with Xiao Han's later marriage — Xiao Han became the commander of Emperor Taizong's Han guards.  In 945 (by which time Emperor Taizong had changed the name of his Khitan state to Liao, and by which time central China was ruled by Later Jin), when Emperor Taizong's army was battling that of the Later Jin general Du Wei and initially prevailed, Xiao advocated having the Liao cavalry get off their horses and shooting at Du's army with bows.  Emperor Taizong agreed, but once the Liao cavalry soldiers did so, a Later Jin counterattack caused the battle to go against Liao with heavy losses, much to Emperor Taizong's regret.

Brief control of central China 
By spring 947, Emperor Taizong had entered Later Jin's capital Daliang and taken its emperor Shi Chonggui captive.  He initially declared himself the emperor of China as well, but soon tired of Han rebellions.  He decided to return to Liao proper, and he left Xiao Han in charge of Daliang, as the military governor (Jiedushi) of Xuanwu Circuit (宣武, headquartered at Daliang).  Xiao wanted to seize some 50 remaining Later Jin ladies in waiting from Zide Palace (滋德宮), but the eunuch in charge, Zhang Huan (張環), refused.  He forcibly broke down the palace door and seized the ladies in waiting, and then burned Zhang to death by holding heated iron against Zhang's body.

By summer 947, Emperor Taizong had died on the way back to Liao proper, and had been succeeded by his nephew Yelü Ruan (as Emperor Shizong).  Xiao himself was facing increasing pressure from Han rebellions, and he considered how he could withdraw from Daliang safely, particularly with one of the main resisters to Liao rule, Liu Zhiyuan (who had declared himself emperor of a new state later known as Later Han, bearing down on him.  He decided to claim that Emperor Taizong had ordered that he turn over central China over to Li Congyi, a prince of Later Jin's predecessor state Later Tang.  He forcibly seized Li and Li's mother Consort Dowager Wang from Luoyang and had them brought to Daliang, and then declared Li emperor, before withdrawing.  (Li later surrendered to Liu, but was killed.)

As Xiao withdrew toward Liao proper, when he reached Heng Prefecture (恆州, Chengde's capital), he and another Liao general, Yelü Mada (耶律麻荅), had soldiers surround the mansion of an ethnically Han chancellor, Zhang Li, as Yelü Mada and he both bore grudges against Zhang.  He wanted to kill Zhang, but Yelü Mada persuaded him not to, although Zhang soon died in anger.  Xiao joined Emperor Shizong on the way back to Liao proper, as Emperor Shizong prepared to confront the army of Empress Dowager Shulü, who wanted Emperor Taizong's younger brother Yelü Lihu to be emperor.  As the two armies met, Empress Dowager Shulü inquired of Xiao, "What resentment do you have that you rebelled against me?"  He responded to her, "Your subject's mother was sinless, but the Empress Dowager killed her.  I cannot fail to have anger toward you."  Later, after Empress Dowager Shulü decided to capitulate based on the advice of Yelü Wuzhi (耶律屋質), Emperor Shizong was able to take the throne.  In 948, Xiao married Emperor Shizong's sister Yelü Abuli (耶律阿不里).

Death 
Also in 948, Xiao entered into a conspiracy against Emperor Shizong with Emperor Taizong's son Yelü Tiande (耶律天德), Emperor Taizong's cousin Yelü Liuge (耶律劉哥), and Yelü Liuge's brother Yelü Pendu (耶律盆都).  When their plot was discovered, Yelü Tiande was executed; Yelü Liuge was exiled; and Yelü Pendu was sent as an emissary to Xiajiasi.  Xiao was caned, but after he swore that he was not involved, was released.  In 949, however, he and Yelü Abuli tried to write Emperor Taizu's younger brother Yelü Anduan (耶律安端) to try to persuade Yelü Anduan to join a new conspiracy.  Their letter was intercepted by Yelü Wuzhi, who presented it to Emperor Shizong.  As a result, Xiao was executed, and Yelü Abuli was imprisoned, and she died of illness while imprisoned.

Notes and references 

 Old History of the Five Dynasties, vol. 98.
 History of Liao, vol. 113.
 Zizhi Tongjian, vols. 286, 287.

9th-century births
949 deaths
Year of birth unknown
10th-century Khitan people
Liao dynasty jiedushi of Xuanwu Circuit
Executed Liao dynasty people
People executed by the Liao dynasty
Xiao clan